Notable events of 2010 in webcomics.

Events

Keenspot stopped being a webcomic collective and moved to content development and publishing on July 1.
After launching a new mobile platform, DC Comics shuts down their Zuda Comics imprint in July.
The New England Webcomics Weekend was held for the second and last time on November 6–7.

Awards
Clickburg Webcomic Awards, won by Hallie Lama, Setsuna, and Michiel van de Pol.
Eagle Awards, "Favourite Web-Based Comic" won by Warren Ellis and Paul Duffield's FreakAngels.
Eisner Awards, "Best Digital Comic" won by Cameron Stewart's Sin Titulo.
Harvey Awards, "Best Online Comics Work" won by Scott Kurtz' PvP.
Ignatz Awards, "Outstanding Online Comic" won by Mike Dawson's Troop 142.
Joe Shuster Awards, "Outstanding Webcomic Creator" won by Karl Kerschl (The Abominable Charles Christopher).
Hugo Award for Best Graphic Story won by Kaja Foglio, Phil Foglio, and Cheyenne Wright's Girl Genius, Volume 9.

Webcomics started

 January — Molarity Redux by Michael Molinelli
 January 8 — Denma by Yang Yeong-soon
 February 9 — Zahra's Paradise by Amil and Khalil
 February 23 — Dream Life, a late coming of age by Salgood Sam
 April 1 — I Taste Sound by Mike Riley
 May 8 — Go Get a Roomie! by Chloé C.
 June 12 — Whomp! by Ronnie Filyaw
 June 30 — Paranatural by Zack Morrison
 July — Vattu by Evan Dahm
 July 14 — Unsounded by Ashley Cope
 August 27 — Shadowbinders by Kambrea and Thom Pratt
 December 24 — The Wormworld Saga by Daniel Lieske
 Along with the Gods by Joo Ho-min
 Cheapjack Shakespeare by Shaun McLaughlin
 Cheese in the Trap by Soonkki
 Crocodile in Water, Tiger on Land
 Si Juki by Faza Ibnu Ubaidillah Salman
 Tower of God by Lee Jong-hui

Webcomics ended
 Goats by Jonathan Rosenberg, 1997 – 2010
 8-Bit Theater by Brian Clevinger, 2001 – 2010
 A Modest Destiny by Sean Howard, 2003 – 2010
 Girly by Jackie Lesnick, 2003 – 2010 
 Fission Chicken by J.P. Morgan, 2006 – 2010
 Order of Tales by Evan Dahm, 2008 – 2010
 Writer J by Oh Seong-dae, 2009 – 2010

References

 
Webcomics by year